Amolops marmoratus is a species of ranid frog found in Asia. Its common names include marbled sucker frog, marbled cascade frog, Pegu torrent frog, and many others. The taxonomic status of many populations formerly assigned to this species is uncertain.

Description
It is a relatively small species among Amolops.

Distribution and habitat
Amolops marmoratus is only known with certainty from Myanmar and likely from northern Thailand, though it may occur more widely. For example, International Union for Conservation of Nature (IUCN), using a less stringent delineation of the species, reported the species also from Bangladesh, Bhutan, China, India, and Nepal. While IUCN in its assessment in 2004 considered Amolops marmoratus to be of "Least Concern" in view of its wide distribution and presumed large population, recognizing higher biodiversity within the species warrants further assessment of its conservation status.

As is typical for the genus Amolops, Amolops marmoratus lives near fast-flowing mountain streams.

References

marmoratus
Amphibians of Myanmar
Amphibians of Thailand
Amphibians described in 1855
Taxa named by Edward Blyth